Churchdown railway station was situated on the main line between Gloucester and Cheltenham Spa.  It served Churchdown and surrounding areas.

History

thumb|Up holiday express from Torbay near Churchdown in 1957
The railway line between Cheltenham and  opened on 4 November 1840, the final section of the Birmingham and Gloucester Railway (B&G) which had been authorised in 1836. At first, there were no intermediate stations, but on 9 August 1842 the first station at Churchdown was opened by the B&G; it proved to be temporary, being closed again on 27 September. Less than a year later, on 22 August 1843, a station opened closer to Cheltenham at nearby . Both stations were built in response to request from the residents of Badgeworth for a station closer than Cheltenham or Gloucester; Churchdown was the first choice of the railway company since it was closer to the half-way point between the two towns.

The permanent station at Churchdown was opened on 2 February 1874, and was the joint property of the Midland Railway (successor to the B&G) and the Great Western Railway, who had shared the line since 1847.

The station closed on 2 November 1964, as part of the reshaping of British Railways  or more commonly known as the Beeching Axe by Dr Beeching.

Little remains of the station itself next to what is now Station Close, but through traffic continues on the line.

Routes

References

Further reading

Disused railway stations in Gloucestershire
Former Midland Railway stations
Former Great Western Railway stations
Railway stations in Great Britain opened in 1842
Railway stations in Great Britain closed in 1842
Railway stations in Great Britain opened in 1874
Railway stations in Great Britain closed in 1964
Beeching closures in England
1842 establishments in England